Harry C. "Bud" Mallott (June 11, 1917 – January 28, 1996) was a member of the Ohio House of Representatives, representing Clermont County from 1973 to 1990. He died in 1996 at the age of 78.

References

1996 deaths
Members of the Ohio House of Representatives
1917 births
20th-century American politicians
People from Clermont County, Ohio